Auldearn Castle was a castle near the village of Auldearn, Highland in Scotland.

History
Constructed as an earth and timber motte-and-bailey castle during the reign of William the Lion in the late 12th century.  The castle was handed over by the constable Gillecolm de Madderty to Donald Meic Uilleim during a revolt in Moray in 1187. It was a royal castle used by the Scottish Crown. The castle was the site of the fealty of William, Earl of Ross to King Robert the Bruce in 1308.

Notes

Citations

References

Ruined castles in Highland (council area)